Bixi Township is a township that is located in Nanjian Yi Autonomous County, Yunnan, China.

Administrative division
As of 2018, the town is divided into eight villages: 
 Zhonghua
 Songlin
 Xingzishan
 Huilongshan
 Yongning
 Xinhu
 Hele
 Fengxian

History
During the Great Leap Forward, it known as "Bixi Commune" in 1958.  It was incorporated as a township in 1988.

Geography
It lies at the southwestern of Nanjian Yi Autonomous County, bordering Fengqing County to the west, the towns of Gonglang and Xiaowandong to the south, Leqiu Township and Weishan Yi and Hui Autonomous County to the north, and Yongcui Township to the east.

The highest point is Fenghuang Mountain, elevation .

Economy
The economy is supported primarily by farming, ranching and mineral resources. The region mainly produce tea, tobacco, and Juglans sigillata. The region also has an abundance of gold, copper, iron, limestone, and molybdenum.

Demographics

As of 2020, the National Bureau of Statistics of China estimates the township's population now to be 18,429.

Transportation
The township is crossed by the China National Highway G214.

The township is connected to the Dali–Lincang railway.

References

Bibliography

Divisions of Nanjian Yi Autonomous County